The Standing Committee on Health and Care Services is a standing committee of the Parliament of Norway. It is responsible for policies relating to health services, care and attendance services, public health, drug and alcohol policy, and pharmaceuticals. It corresponds to the Ministry of Health and Care Services. The committee has 15 members and is chaired by Kari Kjønaas Kjos of the Progress Party.

Members 2013–17

References

Standing committees of the Storting
Parliamentary committees on Healthcare